Lamhi or Lamahi is a village, and gram panchayat, just north of the holy city of Varanasi in the Indian state of Uttar Pradesh. The renowned Hindi and Urdu writer Munshi Premchand was born here on 31 July 1880.

There are two villages in the Lamahi Gram Panchayat: Lamahi with a population of 1,841 (2011) and Banwaripur with a population of 764 (2011).

In 2016, Banaras Hindu University established its "Munshi Prem Chandra Memorial Research Institute and Study Centre" in Lamhi.

Transport

Road 
Lamahi is connected to Varanasi and Azamgarh by National Highway 28, a two-lane highway. There is a proposed ring road for Varanasi that would pass near to Lamhi.

Airport 
The nearest airport, Lal Bahadur Shastri International Airport, is 20 km away from Lamhi.

Rail 
The nearest railway station is Varanasi Junction which is situated on the Howrah–Delhi main line. The station is 9 km away from Lamhi.

Points of interest 
 Munshi Premchand Monument and Memorial Park
 Munshi Premchand Smriti Dwar (Munshi Premchand Memorial Gate)
 Munshi Premchand Sarovar
 Lamahi Ram-Reela
 Har Har Mahadev Temple
 Lamahi Post office
 Kashi Temple
 Premchand's photo of torn shoes

Notable individuals 
 Munshi Premchand

References 
 https://ravikumarswarnkar.wordpress.com/tag/%E0%A4%B2%E0%A4%AE%E0%A4%B9%E0%A5%80/
 http://kkyadav.blogspot.in/2014/04/blog-post.html
 http://hindi.firstpost.com/culture/special-story-on-munshi-premchand-village-lamahi-on-his-birthday-pr-44233.html

Villages in Varanasi district
Premchand